Guy Saint-Vil (born 21 October 1942) is a Haitian football forward who played for Haiti in the 1974 FIFA World Cup. He also played for Racing CH. In the United States, he played for the Baltimore Bays in their inaugural year in 1967 for the NPSL, and continued with them into the NASL in 1968.  He later joined the Baltimore Comets in 1975. His younger brother, Roger Saint-Vil, was also a professional player.

References

External links
FIFA profile
 Guy Saint-Vil NASL stats

1942 births
Living people
Sportspeople from Port-au-Prince
1974 FIFA World Cup players
Association football forwards
Racing CH players
Baltimore Bays players
Baltimore Comets players
CONCACAF Championship-winning players
Expatriate soccer players in the United States
Haitian footballers
Haitian expatriate footballers
Haitian expatriate sportspeople in the United States
Haiti international footballers
Ligue Haïtienne players
National Professional Soccer League (1967) players
North American Soccer League (1968–1984) players